Admiral Sir William Alison Dyke Acland, 2nd Baronet,  (18 December 1847 – 26 November 1924) was a Royal Navy admiral.

Early life
William Acland was the eldest son of Sir Henry Acland, 1st Baronet and Sarah Cotton.

Career
Acland rose to the rank of admiral in the Royal Navy.  He was appointed second in command of the Channel Squadron from early June 1901, and hoisted his flag on board the pre-dreadnought battleship HMS Magnificent on 5 June 1901. After a year he was relieved of the command in the Channel Squadron, and struck his flag on the Magnificent on 5 June 1902.

Four months later, he was appointed Admiral Superintendent of the Gibraltar Dockyard, and was received in audience by King Edward VII on 21 October 1902, before taking up the position later the same month when he hoisted his flag at the receiving ship HMS Cormorant on 30 October. He lived at the official residence The Mount at Gibraltar, whilst he held the office of Admiral Superintendent from 1902 to 1904. He was promoted to vice-admiral on 15 March 1904, and left Gibraltar three months later.

He was a Deputy Lieutenant of Devon, and a Justice of the Peace for Oxfordshire and Devon.

Personal life
William Acland married Hon. Emily Anna Smith, daughter of the Rt. Hon. William Henry Smith and Emily Danvers, Viscountess Hambleden, on 7 July 1887, and had the following children:

Sir William Acland, 3rd Baronet (1888–1970)
Sir Hubert Acland, 4th Baronet (1890–1976)

Succession
Acland succeeded his father as 2nd Baronet Acland, of St Mary Magdalen, Oxford on the latter's death on 16 October 1900.  On his death in 1924, he was succeeded in the baronetcy by his eldest son.

References

External links
The Dreadnought Project article

1847 births
1924 deaths
William Alison Dyke
Baronets in the Baronetage of the United Kingdom
Royal Navy admirals
Commanders of the Royal Victorian Order
Deputy Lieutenants of Devon
Nathaniel Cotton family